Sayed Ezz El-Din Moukhtar (9 January 1922 – 19 January 2003) was an Egyptian athlete. He competed in the men's 100 metres and the men's decathlon at the 1948 Summer Olympics.

References

External links
 

1922 births
2003 deaths
Athletes (track and field) at the 1948 Summer Olympics
Egyptian male sprinters
Egyptian decathletes
Olympic athletes of Egypt
People from Tanta